Petroshimi Mahshahr Football Club was an Iranian football team based in Mahshahr, Iran.

Football clubs in Iran